I Love NY, also known as I Love New Year, is an Indian romantic comedy film directed by Radhika Rao and Vinay Sapru starring Sunny Deol and Kangana Ranaut. It was produced by Bhushan Kumar and Krishan Kumar under the banner of T-Series. The main plot was taken from the 1976 Soviet romantic comedy The Irony of Fate (1976) by Eldar Ryazanov. After numerous delays, the film released on 10 July 2015.

Plot
A beautiful musician and a serious Wall Street banker cross paths on New Year's Eve and share experiences that the banker cannot recall. Over the next two days, they fall in love.

Cast

Production
In 2011 directors Radhika Rao and Vinay Sapru announced their intent to begin work on I Love New Year. The film originally had the working title of Happy New Year, but the title was changed because Shah Rukh Khan was working at the same time on a film of that title. Actors Sunny Deol and Kangana Ranaut were cast in the lead roles; Ranaut said that she trained for over a month in order to gain the correct expressions and body language of a musician. Shooting commenced in summer 2011 at Filmalaya Studios in Mumbai, and some scenes were filmed in Bangkok and the final scenes in New York City.

Release
Originally planned for release in April 2013, the film was delayed several times. The film was released on 10 July 2015.

Critical reception
The film received generally negative reviews. Nishi Tiwari of Rediff.com wrote in a 1 out of 5 stars review that it was "criminally unremarkable", criticising the story. Troy Ribeiro of NDTV gave the film 2 out of 5 stars, calling the plot "silly and far-fetched". Filmfare reviewer Rachit Gupta gave the film 3 out of 5 stars, criticising the film's "mish-mash of sentimentality, annoying characters and clichéd rom com developments". Gupta also felt that Deol and Ranaut as a couple were miscast. He also felt that the music was forgettable.

Box office
and was declared a "flop" by Box Office India.

Soundtrack
The song "Judaai" was recreated by Falak Shabir from a song previously composed by himself in 2013 of the same name.

Music composed by: Pritam, Falak Shabir, Anupam Amod, R. D. Burman and DJ Phukan. The song "Aaja Meri Jaan" was recreated by DJ Phukan from a song composed by R. D. Burman in 1993.

Lyrics written by: Mayur Puri, Sayeed Quadri and Falak Shabir.

Background Score composed by: Aadesh Shrivastava.

References

External links

T-Series (company) films
2010s Hindi-language films
2015 films
Films featuring songs by Pritam
Indian romantic comedy films
Indian remakes of foreign films
Films shot in Chicago
Films shot in New York City
2015 romantic comedy films